Oligota is a genus of beetles belonging to the family Staphylinidae.

The genus has cosmopolitan distribution.

Species:
 Oligota adpropinquans Sharp, 1908 
 Oligota aethiops Sharp, 1908

References

Staphylinidae
Staphylinidae genera